Skycourts Towers is a project by National Bonds Corporation PJSC located within the Dubailand Residence Complex in Dubai. The AED 1.6 billion development offers 2,836 apartments across 6 towers.
Dubai's Roads and Transport Authority (RTA) introduced the route between Dubai Mall Metro Station and the nearby area.

Air Conditioning 
Originally planned to be fulfilled by Empower, Alpha Utilities has ended up as the provider of air conditioning to the building via District cooling.

Controversies 
Several residents report that air conditioning charges are unclear and unreasonably high, and have decided to take legal action against Alpha Utilities.

See also 
 List of development projects in Dubai

References

External links 
 

Dubailand
Residential buildings in the United Arab Emirates